Christopher Francis Duffy (24 January 1884 – September 1971) was an English professional footballer who made over 140 appearances in the Football League for Bury. An outside left, he also played League football for Newcastle United, Leicester City and Middlesbrough.

Personal life 
During the First World War, Duffy served in the Tyne Electrical Engineers and the Royal Garrison Artillery. He rose to the rank of lieutenant during the course of his service.

Career statistics

References

1884 births
1971 deaths
Sportspeople from Jarrow
Footballers from Tyne and Wear
English footballers
Association football outside forwards
Jarrow F.C. players
Brentford F.C. players
Middlesbrough F.C. players
Newcastle United F.C. players
Bury F.C. players
North Shields F.C. players
Bradford City A.F.C. players
Leicester City F.C. players
Chester-le-Street Town F.C. players
Southern Football League players
English Football League players
British Army personnel of World War I
Tyne Electrical Engineers soldiers
Royal Garrison Artillery officers